Arthur Zagré (born 4 October 2001) is a French professional footballer who plays as a left-back for Eredivisie club Excelsior, on loan from Monaco.

Club career

Paris Saint-Germain
An academy graduate of Paris Saint-Germain, Zagré signed his first professional contract in September 2018, which tied him to the club until June 2021. In February 2019, he won the Titi d'Or, an annual award which is presented to the most promising talent in the Paris Saint-Germain Youth Academy. Zagré made his professional debut in a 4–0 Ligue 1 win over Toulouse on 25 August 2019.

Monaco
On 29 August 2019, Zagré joined Monaco on a three-year deal. The transfer fee was reportedly of 10 million euros.

Loan to Dijon
On 5 October 2020, Dijon announced the signing of Zagré on a season-long loan deal with an option to extend for another season. He made his debut in a 2–0 league loss to Marseille on 4 April 2021.

Loan to Utrecht
On 25 June 2021, Dutch club Utrecht announced the loan signing of Zagré for two seasons with option to buy.

Loan to Excelsior
On 31 January 2023, Zagré moved on a new loan to Excelsior, also in the Eredivisie.

International career
Born in France, Zagré is of Burkinabé descent. He is a youth international for France.

Career statistics

Honours
Paris Saint-Germain
Ligue 1: 2019–20
Trophée des Champions: 2019

References

External links

2001 births
French sportspeople of Burkinabé descent
Living people
People from Neuilly-sur-Seine
Footballers from Hauts-de-Seine
French footballers
France youth international footballers
Association football defenders
Championnat National 2 players
Ligue 1 players
Eredivisie players
Eerste Divisie players
Paris Saint-Germain F.C. players
AS Monaco FC players
Dijon FCO players
FC Utrecht players
Jong FC Utrecht players
Excelsior Rotterdam players
French expatriate footballers
Expatriate footballers in Monaco
Expatriate footballers in the Netherlands
French expatriate sportspeople in Monaco
French expatriate sportspeople in the Netherlands